

Companies
Equitable Motion Picture Company, an early motion picture production company that merged in 1916 with the World Film Company
Scottish Equitable, is an investment company located in Edinburgh
Equitable PCI Bank
The Equitable Life Assurance Society, life insurance company in the United Kingdom
Equitable Holdings, formerly The Equitable Life Assurance Society of the United States and formerly AXA Equitable Life Insurance Company
Equitable Securities Company, acquired by SunTrust Banks in 1997

Legal
Equity (law)
Equitable remedy
Equitable servitude
Equitable distribution
Equitable tolling
Equitable conversion
Equitable ownership (beneficiary)
Equitable score control

See also
Equitable Building (disambiguation)
Equitation
Equity (disambiguation)